Midas is a 2011 South Korean television series starring Jang Hyuk, Lee Min-jung and Kim Hee-ae. It tells the story of life in the mergers & acquisitions, stock market, and financial world amidst company takeovers and stock manipulation. It aired on SBS from February 22 to May 3, 2011 on Mondays and Tuesdays at 21:55. The series ran for a total of 21 episodes.

Synopsis
Kim Do-hyun is an intelligent man with a modest upbringing. He is the top student in his class at one of the top-tier law schools in the country. While looking for prospective jobs, he is recruited as an attorney for an affluent family whose true wealth may be more than anyone could have imagined. His dreams of a peaceful life with his girlfriend (Lee Jung-yeon) are changed when someone "makes him an offer he can't refuse."

Cast

Main characters
Kim Do-hyun (32 years old) played by: Jang Hyuk
Do-hyun is a smart man with great ambition. Kim graduated at the top of his class from Korea's best university. He was also top of the class in law school. His father had left home when he was a child, leaving him and his mother in poverty. His mother raised him in hardship and died while he was studying in law school. He feels warmth in his heart only when he is with his long-time girlfriend Jung-yeon and her family. He wants to start a family and live happily with Jung-yeon. After graduating from law school, he joins the best law firm in Korea and works for the rich Yoo family. His ambitions soon turn into greed, which, in turn, begins to ruin his life.
Lee Jung-yeon (27 years old) played by: Lee Min-jung
Lee is a longtime girlfriend of Do-hyun. After graduating from nursing school, she was employed by one of Korea's topmost general hospitals and she became a nurse in the said hospital's VIP wing soon after. When Do-hyun starts to become a different person after joining his law firm, Lee is forced to leave Do-hyun because of his greed. She joins Yoo Myung-joon in plotting revenge against Yoo In-hye, who they deemed responsible for Do-hyun's change of character.
Yoo In-hye (40 years old) played by: Kim Hee-ae
Yoo In-hye is the eldest daughter in Yoo Pil-sang's family. The Yoo's seem like the average rich family, but their wealth is at the same level as Samsung and Hyundai. Yoo In-hye has two elder half-brothers, a younger brother and a younger sister. Not all of the five siblings have the same birth mother. In-hye's father left her mother after she had an affair. In order to escape the negative image of "the abandoned daughter of a chaebol", In-hye left Korea for the United States. She received her MBA at university, then gained experience as a securities broker in Wall Street. Now she is the president of her own multibillion-dollar hedge fund. Her grandfather's loan business, her father's real estate business, and her hedge fund company have the power to sway Korea's economy. She is a powerful woman with no romantic experience and has never been married. She hates, but also admires, her father, which gives her conflict. She is the one who will change Do-hyun's life, for better or for worse.
Yoo Myung-joon (31 years old) played by: No Min-woo
Yoo Myung-joon is the younger brother of Yoo In-hye. Unlike his sister, he has a softer and more-delicate character. He is a patient in the hospital VIP room where Jung-yeon was assigned, and is in the terminal stages of cancer. Myung-joon believes that money is the reason for the misfortunes that he has suffered. Therefore, he views money as evil. Myung-joon has a cynical nature and wastes his time by partying from dusk till dawn. He was like this until Jung-yeon appeared in his life. As time goes by, a chemistry springs up between the two.

Supporting characters
Kim family
Lee Deok-hwa as Kim Tae-sung
Kim Sung-oh as Kim Do-chul, Do-hyun's half-brother

Yoo family
Kim Sung-kyum as Yoo Pil-sang
Choi Jung-woo as Yoo Ki-joon, In-hye's oldest brother
Yoon Je-moon as Yoo Sung-joon, In-hye's second brother
Han Yoo-i as Yoo Mi-ran, In-hye's little sister

Extended cast
Chun Ho-jin as Choi Gook-hwan
Shin So-yul as Kwon Yi-ji
Lee Moon-soo as Lee Yong-gook
Jung Suk-won as Jae-beom
Seo Joo-ae as Soo-ji
Lee Sang-yeob as Han Jang-seok
Ricky Kim as Steven Lee
Kim Ji-young as Woo Geum-ji
Jo Sang-gook as Go Dong-choon
Shin Seung-hwan as Jae-bok
Lee Hae-yeong as Cha Yeong-min
Kim Seon-il as Choi Gook-hwan
Kim Byung-se as James
Kim Byung-ki as Goo Seong-cheol
Kang Kyung-heon as Bae Jung-ja
Shin Chae-won as Yang Soo-jung
Jeong Gook-hwan as Han Jin Su
Baek Seung-hyeon as Chang-soo
Yeo Ho-min as Hyeon Jin-woo
Lee Seon-ho as Yoon Gi-wook
Choi Young-shin as Room Salon Girl
Jang Won-young as Man-soo
Park Hyuk-kwon as Jang Geun-ho
Kim Euug-soo as Mr. Choi Young Su, president of Shin-heung Bank
Ji Dae-han as Jang Pil-do
Yang Jin-woo as Lee Jeong-do

Awards and nominations

References

External links
  
 
 

Seoul Broadcasting System television dramas
2011 South Korean television series debuts
2011 South Korean television series endings
Korean-language television shows
South Korean romance television series
Television shows written by Choi Wan-kyu
Television series by JS Pictures